Ban Mae is a tambon (subdistrict) of San Pa Tong District, in Chiang Mai Province, Thailand. In 2010 it had a population of 6,635, 3,197 male and 3,438 female. The tambon contains 13 administrative villages and 2,321 households.

Geography
The subdistrict is 6 km west of San Pa Tong district office. It covers an area of 16.65 km2 (10,406 rai), most of it flatland.

Administration
The subdistrict is administered by the Ban Mae Tambon administrative organization (TAO). The subdistrict is divided into 13 administrative villages (mubans).

History
In 1997 the subdistrict administrative organization Ban Mae was established.

References

External links
Website of TAO Ban Mae
thaitambon.com on Ban Mae subdistrict (Thai)

Tambon of Chiang Mai province
Populated places in Chiang Mai province